Hong Kong will participate in the 2011 Asian Winter Games in Almaty and Astana, Kazakhstan from January 30, 2011 to February 6, 2011. The nation will send 3 athletes Hong Kong sends 23 less athletes than it did in 2007, because the Ice hockey team will not compete.

Figure skating

Men

Short track speed skating pictogram

Men

Women

References

Nations at the 2011 Asian Winter Games
Asian Winter Games